The Cleveland Line is a railroad line owned and operated by Norfolk Southern Railway (NS), in the U.S. states of Ohio and Pennsylvania. The line runs from Rochester, Pennsylvania, to Cleveland, Ohio, along a former Pennsylvania Railroad line.

Amtrak's Capitol Limited uses the Cleveland Line between Cleveland and Alliance. Both the eastbound and westbound train are scheduled to use the line during midnight and early morning.

Routing 
From Rochester, the line travels west following the Ohio River between Beaver, Pennsylvania, and Yellow Creek Ohio, where the line turns northwest towards Cleveland. Along the way, the line junctions with the Fort Wayne Line at Alliance, Ohio. At Alliance, most traffic diverges off the Fort Wayne Line and on to the Cleveland Line in order to reach the Chicago Line in Cleveland. From Alliance, the line continues northwest, going through locations such as Ravenna, Hudson, and Maple Heights until the line ends and merges with the Chicago Line in downtown Cleveland.

History 
The Cleveland and Pittsburgh Railroad was chartered in 1836, due to public support in building a railroad line between Cleveland and Pittsburgh. Construction of the line was completed in 1852, with additional branch lines to Akron, Ohio, and Wheeling, West Virginia. In 1871, the C&P was leased to the Pennsylvania Railroad for a 999 year lease, thus, giving the PRR access to Cleveland. During the Pennsylvania Railroad years, the line mainly hosted coal and mineral trains from the Ohio River Valley area that were bound for Cleveland. In 1968, the Pennsylvania Railroad merged with long time rival New York Central Railroad, to form Penn Central Transportation Company. The merger essentially failed, which resulted in the Penn Central declaring bankruptcy by 1970. Conrail was created in 1976 to pick up the pieces of several railroads that had fallen into bankruptcy including the Penn Central. By 1981, Conrail was turning into a profitable operation, due in part to the Staggers Rail Act of 1980. Around this time, Conrail began upgrading the former C&P line between Alliance and Cleveland, as the line was soon to host several trains. Conrail began to remove all of the Chicago-bound train traffic that had previously used the Fort Wayne Line, and rerouted that traffic to the Chicago Line, using the Cleveland Line as the connector line. Upgrading of the line was eventually completed, and Conrail began routing a majority of Chicago bound traffic out of Pittsburgh to the line, to connect with the former New York Central mainline in Cleveland. Ownership of the line was passed on to Norfolk Southern after the Conrail split between CSX Transportation and Norfolk Southern in 1999.

See also
Fort Wayne Line
List of Norfolk Southern Railway lines
Conrail
Pennsylvania Railroad

References

External links
 
 Blet659.org
 |title=Conrail Pittsburgh Division Track Chart (Effective 1998)

Norfolk Southern Railway lines
Rail infrastructure in Ohio
Rail infrastructure in Pennsylvania
Pennsylvania Railroad lines
Conrail lines
Rail transportation in Cleveland